City '68 is a UK 60 minute television anthology series of dramas about the emerging problems of a city. It was created by H.V. Kershaw and produced by Granada Television. Twenty episodes aired from 1967 to 1968.

Directors included Michael Apted and Mike Newell (director).

Among its cast were Bernard Hepton, Yootha Joyce, June Ritchie, Hugh Cross, Phyllida Law, and Bernard Lee.

The series has survived intact, although only two production photographs are available to the public.

External links

1967 British television series debuts
1968 British television series endings
1960s British drama television series